Dakota Daniel Mathias (born July 11, 1995) is an American professional basketball player for the Memphis Hustle of the NBA G League. He played college basketball for Purdue University, and played in the NBA for the Philadelphia 76ers and Memphis Grizzlies.

High school career
Mathias is the son of Dan Mathias and has two older brothers. Mathias was a star basketball player at Elida High School. He entered the starting lineup as a freshman and scored over 1,000 points and broke the school scoring record with 1,902. Mathias scored 28 points a game as a senior at Elida and was First Team All-Ohio twice. He committed to Purdue in November 2013.

College career
Prior to Mathias's freshman season at Purdue, he suffered from mononucleosis and threw up before every practice. By the time his health was better, he suffered injuries to both ankles. Despite this, he never missed any games as a freshman but was not at full strength. He averaged 4.8 points and 2.1 rebounds per game as a freshman but shot just 32.2 percent from 3-point range. He had a procedure to correct sinus issues and a deviated septum prior to his second year. As a junior, Mathias averaged 9.7 points a game, led the team in three-pointers and started every game. He developed a reputation as a coach on the floor, with players frequently going to him if they did not understand something basketball-related. He was an All-Big Ten Honorable Mention and was named to the conference Defensive Team.

As a senior, Mathias evolved into one of the best defensive players in the Big Ten Conference. He scored 23 points against Fairfield on November 29, 2017. In the Round of 32 of the NCAA Tournament, he hit the critical 3-pointer with 13 seconds remaining that decided Purdue's 76–73 victory over Butler. As a senior, he averaged 12.0 points, 4.1 rebounds and 3.9 assists per game on a 30–7 squad. Mathias finished sixth in the NCAA in 3-point field goal percentage at 46.6 percent and owns the Purdue record for career 3-pointers with 250. He was again an All-Big Ten Honorable Mention and named to the conference Defensive Team.

Professional career

Joventut (2018–2019)
After going undrafted in the 2018 NBA draft, Mathias signed a partially guaranteed contract with the Cleveland Cavaliers, joining the team for Summer League. On August 1, 2018, he signed with Divina Seguros Joventut of the Liga ACB in Spain. After an ankle injury that sidelined him between October and December, some pain remained which prevented him from playing regularly, and on March 3, 2019, he and the club agreed to cancel their contract.

Texas Legends (2019–2020)
On July 26, 2019, Mathias signed a training camp contract with the Dallas Mavericks. He was waived on October 16, 2019, but later added to the roster of the Mavs’ NBA G League affiliate, the Texas Legends. He scored 30 points in a win over Sioux Falls Skyforce on November 27. Mathias scored 30 points in a victory over the Oklahoma City Blue on December 9. Mathias averaged 18.1 points, 4.7 rebounds, 3 assists and a steal per game.

Philadelphia 76ers (2020–2021)
On December 3, 2020, Mathias signed a two-way contract with the Philadelphia 76ers, splitting time with their G League affiliate the Delaware Blue Coats. He was waived on January 18, 2021, after averaging 6.0 points and 1.6 assists per game in eight games.

Memphis Grizzlies / Texas Legends (2021–2022)
On December 30, 2021, Mathias signed a 10-day contract with the Memphis Grizzlies via the hardship exception.

On January 9, 2022, Mathias was reacquired by the Texas Legends.

On January 14, 2022, Mathias signed a 10-day contract with the Memphis Grizzlies.

On January 24, 2022, Mathias was reacquired by the Texas Legends. On February 10, he was waived.

Memphis Hustle (2022–present)
Mathias joined the Memphis Grizzlies for the 2022 NBA Summer League. On November 4, 2022, Mathias was named to the opening night roster for the Memphis Hustle.

National team career
Mathias was a part of the Purdue team chosen to represent the United States in the 2017 Summer Universiade in Taipai, Taiwan. The U.S. received a silver medal after losing in the title game to Lithuania.

In 2021, Mathias joined the national team to compete in the Americup qualifiers.

Personal life
Mathias married Gabby Gary, daughter of Mercer head coach Greg Gary, in August 2019.

Career statistics

NBA

Regular season

|-
| style="text-align:left;"|
| style="text-align:left;"|Philadelphia
| 8 || 2 || 15.4 || .396 || .308 || .333 || .9 || 1.6 || .1 || .4 || 6.0
|-
| style="text-align:left;"|
| style="text-align:left;"|Memphis
| 6 || 0 || 2.7 || .333 || .333 || .000 || .3 || .2 || .2 || .0 || 1.0
|- class="sortbottom"
| style="text-align:center;" colspan="2"|Career
| 14 || 2 || 9.9 || .389 || .313 || .500 || .6 || 1.0 || .1 || .2 || 3.9

References

External links

 Purdue Boilermakers bio

1995 births
Living people
American expatriate basketball people in Spain
American men's basketball players
Basketball players from Ohio
Joventut Badalona players
Liga ACB players
Medalists at the 2017 Summer Universiade
Memphis Grizzlies players
Philadelphia 76ers players
Purdue Boilermakers men's basketball players
Shooting guards
Sportspeople from Lima, Ohio
Texas Legends players
Undrafted National Basketball Association players
Universiade medalists in basketball
Universiade silver medalists for the United States
United States men's national basketball team players